Ilham Heydar oghlu Aliyev (born 24 December 1961) is the fourth president of Azerbaijan, serving in the post since 31 October 2003.

The son and second child of the former Azerbaijani leader Heydar Aliyev, Ilham Aliyev became president of Azerbaijan in 2003 following his father's death, in an election defined by election fraud. Azerbaijan being oil-rich has strengthened the stability of Aliyev's regime and enriched ruling elites in Azerbaijan, making it possible for the country to host lavish international events, as well as engage in extensive lobbying efforts.

Aliyev's family have enriched themselves through their ties to state-run businesses. They own significant parts of several major Azerbaijani banks, construction firms and telecommunications firms, and partially owns the country's oil and gas industries. Much of the wealth is hidden through an elaborate network of offshore companies. He was named Corruption's 'Person Of The Year' by Organized Crime and Corruption Reporting Project in 2012. In 2017, it was revealed that Aliyev and his family were involved in Azerbaijani laundromat,  a complex money-laundering scheme to pay off prominent European politicians to deflect criticism of Aliyev and promote a positive image of his regime.

Many observers see Aliyev as a dictator. He rules an authoritarian regime in Azerbaijan; elections are not free and fair, political power is concentrated in the hands of Aliyev and his extended family, corruption is rampant, and human rights violations are severe (including torture, arbitrary arrests, as well as harassment of journalists and non-governmental organizations). The Nagorno-Karabakh conflict continued during Aliyev's presidency and culminated into a full-scale war in 2020 in which Azerbaijan regained control over the Armenian-occupied territories surrounding Nagorno-Karabakh that were lost during the First Nagorno-Karabakh War, as well as a part of Nagorno-Karabakh region itself.

Early life
Ilham Aliyev is the son of Heydar Aliyev, president of Azerbaijan from 1993 to 2003. His mother Zarifa Aliyeva was an Azerbaijani ophthalmologist. He also has an older sister, Sevil Aliyeva. In 1977, Ilham Aliyev entered the Moscow State Institute of International Relations (MGIMO-MSIIR) and in 1982, continued his education as a postgraduate. In 1985 he received a PhD degree in history. From 1985 to 1990 Aliyev lectured at MSIIR. From 1991 to 1994, he led a group of private industrial-commercial enterprises. In 1994–2003, he was vice-president, and later the first vice-president of SOCAR, the state-owned Azerbaijani oil and gas company. Since 1997, Aliyev is the president of the National Olympic Committee of Azerbaijan.

Electoral history and fraud 
In 1999, Ilham Aliyev was elected as the deputy chair of the ruling party New Azerbaijan Party and in 2001, he was elected to the post of first deputy chair at the Second Congress of the Party. At the third Congress of the New Azerbaijan Party held on 26 March 2005, President Aliyev and the first deputy of the Party was unanimously elected to the post of chairman of the Party. The fourth and fifth congresses of the party held in 2008 and 2013 unanimously supported his nomination for the next presidential term.

In 1995, Aliyev was elected to the Parliament of Republic of Azerbaijan; later he became president of the National Olympic Committee (still incumbent).

From 2001 to 2003, Aliyev was head of the Azerbaijani delegation to Parliamentary Assembly of the Council of Europe (PACE).

In August 2003, while his father Heydar Aliyev was still formally president of Azerbaijan but was ill and absent from public events, Ilham Aliyev was appointed as Prime Minister.

2003 election
The official results of the 15 October 2003 elections gave victory to Ilham Aliyev, who earned 76.84% of the votes. The election was defined by election fraud. Human Rights Watch and the Institute for Democracy in Eastern Europe documented arrests of opposition candidates, police violence against journalists and participants in election rallies, and "widespread fraud and abuse" in the conduct of the election itself.

2008 election
Ilham Aliyev was re-elected in 2008 with 87% of the polls. A total of seven candidates filed to run in the election who had to collect 40,000 voter signatures. According to the report of the Election Observation Delegation from the European Parliament the elections took place with no reported unrest and few minor electoral violations. The report also highlights numerous reforms to the Electoral Code in accordance with OSCE and Council of Europe requirements and standards, which include inking of voters, more transparency of voter lists, and the prohibition of government interference in the election process.

During the 2008 presidential elections, PACE observers included a large group of frankly pro-Azerbaijani MPs. The variant of the statement on elections, prepared by the head of the group of observers Andreas Herkel, containing critical remarks, faced the rejection of the pro-Azerbaijani group consisting of Michael Hancock, Eduard Lintner and Paul Ville. Herkel was forced to declare his resignation if criticism did not go into the statement. During the referendum, which lifted the limits on the number of presidential terms for Ilham Aliyev, four PACE deputies – Eduard Litner, Paul Ville, Khaki Keskin and Pedro Agramunt evaluated the referendum as the progress of democracy. In a constitutional referendum in 2009, term limits for the presidency were abolished. The opposition claimed this to be a violation of the Azerbaijani constitution and the European Convention on Human Rights. European Commission said the step "signalled a serious setback".

2013 election

In the 2013 presidential elections held on 9 October, Aliyev claimed victory with 85 percent of the vote, securing a third five-year term. The election results were accidentally released before the polls opened.

Election observation delegations from the Parliamentary Assembly of the Council of Europe and the European Parliament claimed to have observed a free, fair and transparent electoral process with no evidence of voter intimidation. A day before voting began, however, the Central Election Commission released a new smartphone application intended to allow citizens to watch the ballot counting in real time, and instead the app accidentally showed the results of the election before the election had taken place. The Central Election Commission tried to explain this away by saying that the initially displayed results were those of the 2008 election, even though the candidates listed, including Jamil Hasanli in second place, were from the 2013 ballot. Aliyev's main rivals in the election were Jamil Hasanli and Igbal Agazade. In 2013, Amnesty International called on western leaders to present position on jailed activist which was officially charged with tax evasion and illegal business activity.

Observers from the OSCE / ODIHR spoke of restrictions on freedom of speech during elections. The US State Department described the elections as not meeting international standards, and expressing solidarity with the ODIHR's assessment.

There was a controversy over election observers who had allegedly been paid by the Azerbaijani regime through the Azerbaijani laundromat scandal. A German former lawmaker Eduard Lintner led a mission that claimed that the elections were up to "German standards"; however, Lintner's group had been paid 819,500 euros through the laundromat moneylaundering scheme. According to the OCCRP, there is "ample evidence of its connection to the family of President Aliyev."

2018 election 

Ilham Aliyev got 86.02% of votes in the 2018 presidential election. Major opposition parties did not participate in the election, and evidence indicates that the election was fraudulent.

Policies

Foreign policy 

Azerbaijani foreign relations under Aliyev included strengthened cooperation with the European Union (EU), strong economic ties with Russia, cooperation with NATO via the NATO–Azerbaijan Individual Partnership Action Plan, and close relations with the Organisation of Islamic Cooperation (OIC). using Azerbaijan's oil wealth, the Azerbaijani regime engages in extensive lobbying efforts, using complex money-laundering and bribery schemes discovered during the Azerbaijani laundromat scandal, such as Caviar diplomacy, to pay off prominent European politicians to deflect and whitewash criticism of Aliyev and promote a positive image of his regime and gain support for Azerbaijani projects.

During Aliyev's presidency, in 2019, Azerbaijan was elected chair of the Turkic Council, as well as Non-Aligned Movement for a three-year mandate.

United Nations 
 Ilham Aliyev attended and addressed the general debates of the 59th, 65th and 72 sessions (2004, 2010, 2017) of the UN General Assembly.

European Union 

Ilham Aliyev expanded cooperation with the European Union (EU) during his presidency, using caviar diplomacy as a controversial technique of persuading European officials to support Azerbaijani projects. in 2004, Azerbaijan became part of the European Neighbourhood Policy (ENP) of the EU. In 2006, Aliyev and Matti Vanhanen, president of the European Council, and José Manuel Barroso, president of the commission, signed the Memorandum of Understanding on a Strategic Partnership.

In 2009, Azerbaijan was included in the Eastern Partnership Policy. In 2011, Aliyev and José Manuel Barroso concluded the Joint Declaration on the Southern Gas Corridor.

On 6 February 2017, Aliyev visited Brussels, the capital of the EU, where he paid visits to High Representative of the EU for Foreign Affairs and Security Policy, with the President of the European Council, Commission President, and the Commissioner for Energy Union. which resulted in signing the "Partnership Priorities" between EU and Azerbaijan on 11 July 2018.

France 
During 12–15 March 2017, Aliyev made an official visit to France and met with executive officials of international companies SUEZ, DCNS, CIFAL, Space Systems in the Airbus Defence and Space Division. during a meeting with French entrepreneurs, he stated that the  activities of some companies in the Republic of Artsakh is "unacceptable and violates international and national laws". Following his visit, Aliyev met with the French President in the Elysee Palace. French President Francois Hollande made a press statement in which he stated that "the status quo in Nagorno-Karabakh conflict is not the right option and he hopes that there can be a resumption of negotiations." During the 2020 Nagorno-Karabakh War, in which France supported Azerbaijan's adversary Armenia, Aliyev demanded that French president Emmanuel Macron apologize for accusing Azerbaijan of using Syrian mercenaries.

Russia 

On 6 February 2004, Aliyev and Vladimir Putin, the president of Russia, signed the Moscow Declaration, which stated principles of relations between Azerbaijan and Russia. On 16 February 2005 Aliyev participated in the ceremony of opening the Year of Azerbaijan in Russia. On 29 June 2006, Ilham Aliyev and Dmitry Medvedev, former President of the Russian Federation, concluded a joint statement on the Caspian Sea. In 2018, Aliyev and Putin signed Joint Statement on Priority Areas of Economic Cooperation between the two countries. Aliyev met with Russian and Iranian leaders in Baku in 2016 to discuss terrorism, transnational organized crime, arms smuggling and drug trafficking in the region. the trilateral summit signed a declaration to develop the International North–South Transport Corridor, which would run from India to Saint Petersburg, providing better alternatives to existing sea routes.

United States

Aliyev has met with multiple U.S. Presidents during his tenure: George W. Bush, Barack Obama, and Donald Trump.

North Atlantic Treaty Organisation (NATO) 

During Aliyev's presidency, Azerbaijan joined the Individual Partnership Action Plan. Azerbaijan has completed NATO-Azerbaijan Individual Partnership Action Plan (IPAP) documents for three periods. Ilham Aliyev introduced Azerbaijan's first IPAP to NATO in Brussels on 19 May 2014.

Aliyev has attended several NATO summits and other meetings. Azerbaijan contributed to the NATO-led "Resolute Support" mission in Afghanistan.

Domestic policy

Religious policy 
On 10 January 2017 Ilham Aliyev announced 2017 as the year of Islamic Solidarity and allocated funds to organize the related events. In 2014 and 2015, Aliyev allocated funds from Presidential Reserve Fund multiple time towards efforts to promote "interreligious dialogue and tolerance" and to restore monuments in Azerbaijan.

Corruption 
Corruption is rampant in Azerbaijan. According to Transparency International, Azerbaijan scores just 30 on the Transparency International Corruption Perceptions Index, indicating a serious problem with corruption. On 8 August 2017, Transparency Azerbaijan announced that it had scaled back its operations in the capital city of Baku, because the government would not approve an extension of the funding as it comes from outside the country. According to Transparency International "The blanket ban on foreign grants has brought the country's civil society to a halt and has dealt a devastating blow to civic initiatives across the board".

LGBT rights 
Discrimination against LGBT people is severe in Azerbaijan. In 2020, ILGA-Europe again declared Azerbaijan the worst country in all of Europe for LGBT rights, with the country receiving a final score of just 2%. Human rights activists have criticized Aliyev's record on LGBT rights.

International sporting events 

Azerbaijan's oil wealth has made it possible for the country to host lavish international events.

Aliyev is the president of the National Olympic Committee since 1997. During his presidency, Azerbaijan hosted some international sports events such as the 2015 European Games, 4th Islamic Solidarity Games and 42nd Chess Olympiad and  the 2016 European Grand Prix. Aliyev attended various opening and award ceremonies where he awarded the winning prizes.

Economic policy

Upon becoming president in 2003, Aliyev was positioned to enjoy a booming economy fueled by the oil and gas sector; Azerbaijan had the world's fastest rate of economic growth in the three-year period from 2005–2007. Azerbaijan's oil riches strengthened the stability of Aliyev's regime and enriched ruling elites in Azerbaijan.   However, periods of low oil prices, as well as inflation, weakened the Azerbaijani economy and slowed economic growth. Aliyev continued the neopatrimonial system inherited from his father. Azerbaijan's oligarchic system inhibited smaller businesses and blocked foreign investment outside the fossil fuels sector. Persistent pledges by Aliyev and Azerbaijani elites to prioritize economic diversification yielded few major results, as the country remained largely depended on oil and gas. The International Monetary Fund has urged Azerbaijan to diverse its economy. Efforts to economically liberalize were inhibited by the authorities' fear of political liberalization. Currency devaluation has been another economic challenge under Aliyev's tenure. In a rare public criticism of other government officials, Aliyev criticized his Economy Minister Shakhin Mustafayev and other Cabinet members for frequently shifting economic forecasts, and for seeking to block economic reforms by blackmailing and denigrating other officials.

Criticism

Wealth and corruption 
The Aliyev family have enriched themselves through their ties to state-run businesses. They own significant parts of at several major Azerbaijani banks, construction firms and telecommunications firms, well as partially own the country's oil and gas industries. Much of the wealth is hidden in offshore companies. The 2021 Pandora Papers leaks showed that the Aliyev family built vast offshore network to hide their money. The family and their close associates have secretly been involved in property deals in the UK worth more than £400m.

Andrew Higgins, writing in The Washington Post, stated in 2010 that Azerbaijanis with the same names as Ilham Aliyev's three children owned real estate in Dubai worth about $75 million. Higgins stated that some members of the family are indeed wealthy, such as the president's older daughter, Leyla, married to Emin Agalarov, a Russian billionaire, and relatives of the first lady who have businesses in Azerbaijan.

Journalist Khadija Ismayilova, who worked for the United States government-funded Radio Free Europe/Radio Liberty, carried out journalistic investigations, and claimed that Aliyev's family controlled some companies such as "Azerfon", "Azenco", and assets worth $3 billion in the largest Azerbaijani banks.

In 2012, the Organized Crime and Corruption Reporting Project called Ilham Aliyev the person of the year in organized crime and corruption. Also in 2012, CNBC filmed the film Filthy Rich about corruption which also mentioned the Aliyev family.

According to a 2013 investigation the International Consortium of Investigative Journalists (ICIJ), Aliyev family owned at least four offshore companies directly connected with Hassan Gozal. ICIJ stated that family members never declared the Aliyevs' offshore companies, that Ilham and Mehriban Aliyevs had no legal right to open offshore companies, and that when these companies were opened, measures were taken to conceal the real owners. When registering the companies, Aliyev's daughters indicated property worth about $6 million. Investigation of Swedish television showed that offshore companies controlled by Aliyevs received from TeliaSonera the Swedish telecommunications company, a factual bribe in the form of shares of Azercell cellular operator in the amount of 600-700 million dollars (due to the estimate of 2005), which was purchased for only 6.5 million dollars. In a resolution on 10 September 2015, the European Parliament called on the EU authorities to conduct a thorough investigation of allegations of corruption against Ilham Aliyev and his family members.

His critic Khadija Ismayilova was detained in December 2014 and sentenced in September 2015 to seven-and-a-half years in prison on trumped-up charges. She was conditionally released in May 2016, but three and a half years later, still remains subject to a travel ban and has been unable to leave the country despite numerous applications to do so. Lawyers will be seeking permission for Ismayilova to travel to the UK to give evidence in the trial of Paul Radu, a Romanian journalist who is co-founder and executive director of investigative reporting group OCCRP (the Organized Crime and Corruption Reporting Project). Radu is being sued for defamation in London by Azerbaijani MP, Javanshir Feyziyev, over two articles in OCCRP's award-winning Azerbaijan Laundromat series about money-laundering out of Azerbaijan. Ismayilova, OCCRP's lead reporter in Azerbaijan, is a key witness in the case.

Aliyev was also included on a list of figures (others being the Minister of Emergency Situations Kamaladdin Heydarov, head of the Presidential Administration Ramiz Mehdiyev and First Lady Mehriban Aliyeva) accused of accepting bribes of 1,000,000$ USD from MP candidates to guarantee their "election win" and inclusion to the parliament. This high-level corruption scandal is widely called the Gulargate.

Lobbying and moneylaundering 
Azerbaijan's oil wealth has made it possible for the regime to engage in extensive lobbying efforts. In 2017, the Aliyev family was implicated in the Azerbaijani laundromat scandal, which was a complex money-laundering scheme to pay off prominent European politicians to deflect criticism of Aliyev and promote a positive image of his regime.

Authoritarianism 
Aliyev rules an authoritarian regime in Azerbaijan, as elections are not free and fair, power is concentrated in the hands of Aliyev and his extended family, corruption is rampant, and human rights violations are severe (which included torture, arbitrary arrests, as well as harassment of journalists and non-governmental organizations). Many observers see Aliyev as a dictator.

Human rights violations 
Human rights violations in Azerbaijan during Aliyev's presidency include torture, arbitrary arrests and harassment of journalists and non-governmental organizations.

Political rights and media freedom 
In a speech delivered on 15 July 2020, during the 2020 Armenian–Azerbaijani clashes, President Aliyev targeted the largest opposition party, the Popular Front Party of Azerbaijan. He declared that "we need to finish with the 'fifth column'" and the Popular Front is "worse than the Armenians." According to Azerbaijani sources as many as 120 people are currently held in jail, including some deputy leaders of the party as well as journalists. On July 20 the U.S. State Department urged Azerbaijan to avoid using the pandemic to silence "civil society advocacy, opposition voices, or public discussion." These actions are widely seen as an attempt "to eliminate pro-democracy advocates and political rivals once and for all". According to RFE/RL, "Aliyev's authoritarian rule has shut down independent media outlets and suppressed opposition parties while holding elections deemed neither free nor fair by international monitoring groups".

Controversies

Ramil Safarov repatriation

In 2012, Aliyev convinced the government of Hungary to transfer convicted murderer Ramil Safarov to Azerbaijan to complete the rest of his prison term. While attending a NATO-sponsored English-language course in Hungary, Safarov had murdered an Armenian lieutenant who was also taking the course, Gurgen Margaryan, while Margaryan was asleep. Safarov admitted that he committed the crime and surrendered himself to the police. Safarov has justified the act based over the Naghorno Karabakh conflict between the two countries from 1988 to 1994. Safarov had been tried and sentenced to life imprisonment in Hungary. However, after being extradited to Azerbaijan, Safarov received a hero's welcome, promoted to the rank of major, and given an apartment and over eight years of back pay, covering the time he had spent in jail.

Statements about Armenia and Nagorno-Karabakh

Shortly after thousands of Azerbaijani people gathered to commemorate the Khojaly massacre, in which more than 200 ethnic Azerbaijanis had been killed by the Armenian irregular forces and the 366th CIS regiment of the Soviet Union 20 years earlier, Aliyev posted in his official website: "Our main enemies are Armenians of the world and the hypocritical and corrupt politicians that they control". However, according to the same sources of citation, it is the Armenian leadership who are the real targets of President Aliyev's criticism. During his speech, Ilham Aliyev noted: "I once said that the Armenian people should not be afraid of us, they should be afraid of their own leadership."

In 2008, Aliyev declared that "Nagorno Karabakh will not be independent; the position is backed by international mediators as well; Armenia has to accept the reality" and also stated that "in 1918, Yerevan was granted to the Armenians. It was a great mistake. The khanate of Iravan was the Azerbaijani territory, the Armenians were guests there." President Ilham Aliyev stated, "the occupation of the territory of the sovereign State with its internationally recognized boundaries – our territorial integrity is recognized by the United Nation and has been left out of due attention of the international community. All these facts are the ever seen injustice." "No project can be carried out in the Armenian occupied Azerbaijani territories without the consent and participation of Azerbaijan."

On 20 September 2017, at the 72nd Regular Session of the UN General Assembly, President Aliyev reminded unexecuted UN Security Council Resolutions regarding Nagorno-Karabakh: "In 1993, United Nations Security Council adopted 4 resolutions demanding immediate and unconditional withdrawal of Armenian troops from the territory of Azerbaijan. Armenia for 24 years ignores UN Security Council resolutions and unfortunately is not punished for that. In some cases, UN Security Council resolutions are implemented within days. In our case it's 24 years that resolutions are not implemented. This is a double standards approach. This approach is unacceptable." He reiterated the significance of international law for the resolution of conflict: "Armenia-Azerbaijan Nagorno-Karabakh conflict must be resolved on the basis of international law, relevant UN Security Council resolutions. Territorial integrity of Azerbaijan must be completely restored."

Personal life

Ilham Aliyev married Mehriban Aliyeva in Baku on 22 January 1983. They have three children, Leyla, Arzu and Heydar; and five grandchildren. He is fluent in Azerbaijani, English, French, Russian and Turkish. His wife is also the first Vice President of Azerbaijan.

Honours

National honours and medals 
  – Heydar Aliyev Order
  – Order of Sheikhulislam

Foreign honours

  – Order of the Star of Romania (2004)
  – Order of Abdulaziz Al Saud (2005)
  – Order of Honor of Georgia
  - Order of Stara Planina
  – Grand Cross of the Legion of Honor
  – Order of Merit of the Republic of Poland
  – First Class of the Order of Prince Yaroslav the Wise (2008)
  – Order of Mubarak the Great
  – Gold Medal of the Hellenic Republic
  – Knight Grand Cross of the Order of the Three Stars
  – Grand Cross of Faithful Service
  – Order of Ismoili Somoni
  – First Class of the Order of the State of Republic of Turkey (2013)
  – Order of Liberty (2013)
  – Order of the Republic of Serbia (2013)
  – Knight Grand Cross with Collar of the Order of Merit of the Italian Republic (12 July 2018)
  – "Friendship" order of Bulgaria (2019)
  – Order of the Golden Eagle (22 August 2022)

International organizations
  Medal For Distinction in Protection of CIS State Borders and Badge for Strengthening of Border Cooperation (2008).
  Organization of Turkic States – Supreme Order of Turkic World
Others
  – İhsan Doğramacı Prize for International Relations for Peace
  – Prepodobniy Sergiy Rodonejskiy first degree Order of Russian Orthodox Church
 International Military Sports Council – Grand Cordon Order of Merit

Honorary degrees
Aliyev has also received honorary degrees from universities from the following states: Turkmenistan, Belarus, Russia, Bulgaria, Turkey, Ukraine, Kazakhstan, Romania, Jordan, Hungary, Azerbaijan and South Korea

See also

 Politics of Azerbaijan

References

External links

 Official Azerbaijan president website
 BBC profile: Ilham Aliyev
 Political portrait of Ilham Aliyev
 Ilham Aliyev and oil diplomacy of Azerbaijan 
 

 
1961 births
Living people
Ilham Aliyev
Azerbaijani Shia Muslims
Moscow State Institute of International Relations alumni
Politicians from Baku
Presidents of Azerbaijan
Prime Ministers of Azerbaijan
New Azerbaijan Party politicians
Children of national leaders
Grand Croix of the Légion d'honneur
Recipients of the Heydar Aliyev Order
Recipients of the Order of Holy Prince Daniel of Moscow
Recipients of the Order of Honor (Georgia)
Recipients of the Order of Merit of the Republic of Poland
Recipients of the Order of Prince Yaroslav the Wise
Recipients of the Order of the Star of Romania
People named in the Panama Papers
Deniers of the Armenian genocide
People named in the Pandora Papers
Chairmen of the Turkic Council
Secretaries-General of the Non-Aligned Movement
Knights Grand Cross with Collar of the Order of Merit of the Italian Republic
Recipients of the Supreme Order of Turkic World
Leaders of political parties in Azerbaijan